Houston Fire Station No. 7 is a historic fire station located at 2403 Milam Street in Houston, Texas. It was listed on the National Register of Historic Places on April 17, 1986. The fire station was built in 1898 and opened the next year as the first paid station in Houston. It was active until a replacement was built 1969.  The building has been used as the Houston Fire Museum after a renovation, started in 1980.

See also
 National Register of Historic Places listings in Harris County, Texas

References

External links
 

Fire stations on the National Register of Historic Places in Texas
Museums in Houston
National Register of Historic Places in Houston
Recorded Texas Historic Landmarks